The People's Republic of the Congo competed at the 1984 Summer Olympics in Los Angeles, United States.

Results by event

Athletics
Men's 400 metres
 Jean Didace Bemou
 Heat — 46.26 (→ did not advance)

References
 Official Olympic Reports

External links
 

Nations at the 1984 Summer Olympics
1984
O